The following outline is provided as an overview of and topical guide to Transnistria:

Transnistria is a breakaway state located mostly on a strip of land between the River Dniester and the eastern Moldovan border with Ukraine. Since its declaration of independence in 1990, and especially after the War of Transnistria in 1992, it has been governed as the Pridnestrovian Moldavian Republic (PMR, also known as Pridnestrovie), a state with limited recognition that claims territory to the east of the River Dniester, and also to the city of Bender (Tighina) and its surrounding localities on the west bank in the historical region of Bessarabia. The names "Transnistria" and "Pridnestrovie" both refer to the Dniester River. Unrecognised by any United Nations member state, Transnistria is designated by the Republic of Moldova as the Transnistria autonomous territorial unit with special legal status (Unitatea teritorială autonomă cu statut juridic special Transnistria), or Stînga Nistrului ("Left Bank of the Dniester").

General reference 

 Pronunciation:
 Common English country name:  Transnistria
 Official English country name:  The Pridnestrovian Moldavian Republic
 Common endonym(s):   Transnistrian, Pridnestrovian
 Official endonym(s):  
 Adjectival(s):
 Demonym(s):
 Etymology: Name of Transnistria
 ISO country codes:  See the Outline of Moldova
 ISO region codes:  See the Outline of Moldova
 Internet country code top-level domain:  See the Outline of Moldova

Geography of Transnistria 

Geography of Transnistria
 Transnistria is: a de facto independent though partially recognised sovereign state
 Location:
 Northern Hemisphere and Eastern Hemisphere
 Eurasia
 Europe
 Eastern Europe
 Time zone:  Eastern European Time (UTC+02), Eastern European Summer Time (UTC+03)
 Extreme points of Transnistria

 Population of Transnistria: 

 Area of Transnistria: 4163 km2
 Atlas of Transnistria

Environment of Transnistria 

 Climate of Transnistria
 World Heritage Sites in Transnistria: None

Regions of Transnistria 

Regions of Transnistria

Ecoregions of Transnistria 

List of ecoregions in Transnistria
 Ecoregions in Transnistria

Administrative divisions of Transnistria 

Administrative divisions of Transnistria
 Raions of Transnistria
 Municipalities of Transnistria

Raions of Transnistria 

Raions of Transnistria
Camenca
Dubăsari
Grigoriopol
Rîbniţa
Slobozia

Municipalities of Transnistria 

Municipalities of Transnistria
 Capital of Transnistria: Tiraspol
 Cities of Transnistria
Bendery (Бендéры), officially a separate municipality from Transnistria
Tiraspol (Тира́споль)

Demography of Transnistria 

Demographics of Transnistria
 Demographic history of Transnistria

Government and politics of Transnistria 

Politics of Transnistria
 Form of government: Presidential republic
 Capital of Transnistria: Tiraspol
 Elections in Transnistria
 Political parties in Transnistria

Branches of the government of Transnistria 

Government of Transnistria

Executive branch of the government of Transnistria 
 Head of state: President of Transnistria, Vadim Krasnoselsky
 Cabinet of Transnistria

Legislative branch of the government of Transnistria 

 Parliament of Transnistria (unicameral)

Judicial branch of the government of Transnistria 

Court system of Transnistria
 Supreme Court of Transnistria

Foreign relations of Transnistria 

Foreign relations of Transnistria
 Diplomatic missions in Transnistria
 Diplomatic missions of Transnistria

International organization membership 
none

Law and order in Transnistria 

Law of Transnistria
 Constitution of Transnistria
 Crime in Transnistria
 Human rights in Transnistria
 LGBT rights in Transnistria
 Freedom of religion in Transnistria
 Law enforcement in Transnistria

Military of Transnistria 

Military of Transnistria
 Command
 Commander-in-chief:
 Ministry of Defence of Transnistria
 Forces
 Army of Transnistria
 Navy of Transnistria
 Air Force of Transnistria
 Special forces of Transnistria
 Military history of Transnistria
 Military ranks of Transnistria

Local government in Transnistria 

Local government in Transnistria

History of Transnistria 

History of Transnistria
 History of Transnistria to 1792
 Transnistria Governorate

Culture of Transnistria 

 Media in Transnistria
 National symbols of Transnistria
 Coat of arms of Transnistria
 Flag of Transnistria
 National anthem of Transnistria
 Public holidays in Transnistria
 Religion in Transnistria
 World Heritage Sites in Transnistria: None

Art in Transnistria 
 Television in Transnistria

Economy and infrastructure of Transnistria 

Economy of Transnistria
 Economic rank, by nominal GDP (2007):
 Communications in Transnistria
 Internet in Transnistria
Currency of Transnistria: Rubla
ISO 4217: N/A (informally PRB)
Transnistrian companies
Intercentre Lux

Education in Transnistria 

Education in Transnistria

See also 

Index of Transnistria-related articles
Women in Transnistria
List of international rankings
List of Transnistria-related topics
Outline of Europe
Outline of geography
Outline of Moldova

References

External links 

 BBC: Profile of Trans-Dniester
 Economist: The black hole that ate Moldova
 Organization for Security and Co-operation in Europe Mission to Moldova
 Radio Free Europe: Transdniester Conflict Was Long In The Making
 Jos Boonstra, "Moldova, Transnistria, and European Democracy Polices", FRIDE, February 2007
 Stuart Hensel, Moldova Strategic Conflict Assessment (SCA), Economist Intelligence Unit.

 Local links
  "Chelovek i ego Prava" ("Man and his Rights") , local  newspaper
  Conflict.md , site about the conflict
  Moldova Azi: News from Moldova , news portal
  Moldova.org, non-governmental country portal
  PMR News, English-language news and commentaries

  Pridnestrovie.net, official English site of the PMR authorities
  Transnistria.md, English-language news and interviews
  VisitPMR.com, official tourist information
  Website of the Supreme Council (Parliament) of PMR, official site

Transnistria
Outline